Coming Home for Christmas may refer to:
"Coming Home for Christmas" (song)
Coming Home for Christmas (2013 film)